Bangladesh national kabaddi team won the bronze medal at the 2006 Asian Games. In 1980, Bangladesh became the runners-up in the first Asian Kabaddi Championship and India emerged as the champion. Bangladesh became runners-up again in the next Asian Kabaddi Championship held in 1988 at Jaipur, India. Kabaddi is the national sport of Bangladesh. Bangladesh Kabaddi Federation's (BKF) president Chowdhury Abdullah Al Mamun and General secretary Habibur Rahman is maintaining the National kabaddi team.

Current squad
Name: Mohammad Arduzzaman Munshi - Position: Raider 
Name: Mohammad Zakir Hossain - Position: All-rounder 
Name: Mohammad Tuhin Tarafdar - Position: Left-cover (Defender) 
Name: Mohammad Sabuj Mia - Position: Right-cover (defender) 
Name: Mohammad Abul Kamal Azad - Position: All-rounder 
Name: S M Al Mamun - Position: Raider
Name: Mohammad Ziaur Rahman - Position: Left-cover (defender)
Name: Mohammad Tanjil Hossain - Position: Raider
Name: Mohammad Fardous Sheikh - Position: Left-cover (defender)
Name: Mohammad Jahangir Alom - Position: Raider
Name: Mohammad Ruhul Amin - Position: Right-cover
Name: Niroshan Balasundaram - Position: Raider
Name: Mohammad Soileman Kabir - Position: Raider
Name: Mohammad Shajid Hossain - Position: Left-cover

List of National Awardee in Bangladesh 
1. Abdul Jalil-2001 
2. Badshah Mia-2002 
3. Ziaur Rahaman-2005
4. Amir Hossiin Patwari-2007
5. Jahangir Alom-2009

Tournament history

World Cup

Asian Games

Asian Indoor Games

South Asian Games

Bangabandhu Cup

Bangladesh Kabaddi Federation

Bangladesh Amateur Kabadi Federation was formed in 1973. It framed rules and regulations for the game. For more information visit Bangladesh Kabaddi Federation. Kabaddi is the national sport of Bangladesh

Coaching Staff
Head Coach-  Abdul Jalil

References

Kabaddi
National kabaddi teams
National kabaddi team